NGC 150 (also known as PGC 2052) is a barred spiral galaxy in the constellation Sculptor. It is about 70 million light years away from the Solar System, and it has a diameter of about 55,000 light years. It was discovered on 20 November 1886, by Lewis A. Swift. The Type II supernova SN 1990K was detected in NGC 150, and was reported to be similar to SN 1987A.

References

External links 
 SEDS

Astronomical objects discovered in 1886
Sculptor (constellation)
ESO objects
MCG objects
002052
UGCA objects
0150
Barred spiral galaxies